This is a list of Swamps - (Ciénagas) in these municipalities of Puerto Rico.

Añasco
Ciénaga El Guayabal
Ciénaga Isabel
Ciénaga Pozo Hondo
Arecibo
Ciénaga Tiburones
Cabo Rojo
Ciénaga de Cuevas
Cataño
Ciénaga de las Cucharillas
Río Grande
Ciénaga La Picúa
Toa Baja 
Ciénaga de San Pedro
Vega Alta
Ciénaga Prieta

See also 

List of lakes of Puerto Rico
List of dams and reservoirs in Puerto Rico

External links
Lagos y plantas hidroeléctricas de Puerto Rico - Puerto Rico Lakes and Hidro-Electric Plants
Puerto Rico Guide from Satellite

Swamps